Bəydili (also, Beydili and Begdeli) is a village and municipality in the Bilasuvar Rayon of Azerbaijan.  It has a population of 5276. Bəydili is unique because it has close to 900 local restaurants.

References 

Populated places in Bilasuvar District